Vijaykrishnan Narayanan is the A. Robert Noll Chair of Computer Science and Engineering at Pennsylvania State University. He has been on the faculty at Penn State since 1998. He is an international expert in computer architecture. His research and teaching interests include computer architecture, embedded and mobile computing systems design, power and reliability aware design, and emerging technologies in computing systems.

Biography

Education
Vijaykrishnan Narayanan received his B.E.(Bachelor of Engineering) in Computer Science and Engineering from University of Madras in 1993, and his Ph.D. in Computer Science and Engineering from the University of South Florida in 1998, respectively.

Career
Vijaykrishnan Narayanan joined the faculty of the Pennsylvania State University as an assistant professor in 1998. He was promoted to the rank of full professor in 2007. Vijaykrishnan Narayanan has worked in the area of power-aware design. With colleagues at Penn State, he developed architectural level power simulators, SimplePower and SoftWatt. He has developed application-specific architectures, including the design, implementation, and field-testing of board level designs for DARPA DESA and DARPA Neovision2 programs.

Service to the Computing Community

Narayanan has extensive service to the Computer Science and Engineering research community. He currently serves as the past chair of ACM Special Interest Group on Design Automation. Previously he served as a founding co-Editor-in-Chief of ACM's Journal on Emerging Technologies in Computing Systems and as Editor-in-Chief of IEEE Transactions on Computer-Aided Design of Integrated Circuits and Systems.

Personal life

Honors and awards

A list of all his awards follows.

 2015 ACM Fellow
 2012 ASP-DAC Ten-Year Retrospective Most Influential Paper Award
 2011 IEEE Fellow
 2003 IEEE/CAS VLSI Transactions Best Paper of the Year Award

References

External links
 Home Page

Year of birth missing (living people)
Living people
American computer scientists